Biathlon at the 1964 Winter Olympics consisted of one biathlon event, held at Seefeld. The events began on 9 February and ended on 11 February 1964.

Medal summary

The Soviet Union won two medals in Innsbruck, taking gold and silver in the individual race.

Medal table

Events

Participating nations
Fourteen nations sent biathletes to compete in Innsbruck. Below is a list of the competing nations; in parentheses are the number of national competitors. Austria, Japan, Mongolia, Poland, Romania and Switzerland made their Olympic biathlon debut.

References

 
1964
1964 Winter Olympics events
1964 in biathlon
Biathlon competitions in Austria